Rosa Fort High School (RFHS) is a senior high school in unincorporated Tunica County, Mississippi, adjacent to the North Tunica CDP, and near Tunica. It is a part of the Tunica County School District.

History
After the rise of the gambling industry in the county in the 1990s, an influx of tax revenue went into the school system. In 1990, according to a Fortune article about Tunica, one in three students at Tunica's high school graduated from high school. In 1991 no agency tracked graduation rates. Mehta said that therefore that while "[m]ore kids are graduating from high school - there's no way to know for sure" whether a significant improvement had been made in the year 2007. Mehta that despite the influx of tax revenue, Rosa Fort High in 2007 was "a stubborn underperformer." That year, it was ranked a "two" or "underperforming" in the State of Mississippi's five point scale. Mehta concluded that "Rosa Fort students aren't a whole lot better off academically than before the casinos arrived." Ronald Love, who had been hired by the state in 1997 to supervise the Tunica school system, said  "It is like Tunica suffers from a hangover from 100 years of poverty. There are vestiges of it everywhere: in education, in local politics, in the housing. And when you have been the poorest of the poor, well, an infusion of resources might lighten your load, but you still have the hangover."

 98% of the students were black. This differed from the private Tunica Academy (formerly Tunica Institute for Learning), where 97% were white.

References

External links
 Rosa Fort High School

Schools in Tunica County, Mississippi
Public high schools in Mississippi